Denis Neville Moore (26 September 1910 – 2 October 2003) was an English cricketer. He played first-class cricket for Oxford University and Gloucestershire between 1930 and 1936.

Moore had a spectacular debut season as a batsman in 1930, but in 1931 he suffered a hand injury, closely followed by pneumonia and then pleurisy, and never regained his form. He left the first-class game in his mid-twenties to concentrate on his work in the family law firm in Croydon.

References

External links

1910 births
2003 deaths
English cricketers
Gloucestershire cricketers
Oxford University cricketers
North v South cricketers
Gentlemen cricketers
People educated at Shrewsbury School
People from Tewkesbury
Sportspeople from Gloucestershire
Alumni of The Queen's College, Oxford